False accusations of genocide in Donbas have been made by Russia against Ukraine since 2014. Russian propaganda has claimed that Ukrainian authorities have undertaken measures amidst the war in Donbas that amount to genocide against the Russian speakers of Ukraine. They have been cited by Russian president Vladimir Putin in support of the Russian invasion of Ukraine, a large-scale escalation of the Russo-Ukrainian War.

Following the invasion, Ukraine brought a case before the International Court of Justice (ICJ) concerning Russia's military activities in Ukraine. During the proceedings of Ukraine v. Russian Federation, the ICJ found no evidence to support the Russian accusation of genocide, and subsequently ordered Russia to "immediately suspend the military operations" of the invasion. Further reports by 30 legal and genocide scholars warned that Russian accusations against Ukraine are part of the "accusation in a mirror" technique, ultimately revealing the Russian incitement to commit genocide against Ukrainians.

Accusations

There are a large number of Russian-speaking populations living in the eastern and southern parts of Ukraine, and the Russian-speaking population accounts for the vast majority in the two regions of Donetsk and Luhansk in eastern Ukraine. At the beginning of 2014, pro-Russian President Viktor Yanukovych fled to Russia under the pressure of the pro-democracy movement and the two states declared their independence, triggering the war in Donbas. At the same time, the pro-European government in Kyiv began to gradually use Ukrainian to replace the dominant position of Russian in Ukraine. Since 2014, the Russian government has repeatedly accused Ukraine of genocide against the locals in Donetsk and Luhansk under its control, persecuting local Russian-speaking residents with threats of violence or death.

More than 3,000 civilians died during the fighting in Donbas between 2014 and 2022, but there is no evidence to support the claim that Ukraine committed a genocide of Russian-speaking people or ethnic Russians in Ukraine. Before Russia began its full-scale invasion of Ukraine in 2022, the intensity of the hostilities in the Donbas had been steadily declining since the signing of the Minsk agreements in February 2015.

On February 23, 2022, when tensions on the Russian–Ukrainian border began, Ukraine called on the international community to stop Russia's plans of aggression at the United Nations General Assembly, and Russia's permanent representative to the United Nations, Nebenja, said: "In view of the blatant genocide and the most important The human rights of the people of the world - the right to life are violated, and our country cannot remain indifferent to the fate of the 4 million people of the Donbass."

War crimes committed by Russian forces during the war in Donbas
During the ongoing conflict, Russian forces and their separatists proxies have committed numerous war crimes, including the downing of Malaysia Airlines Flight 17, the intentional targeting of civilians by Russia in Mariupol, the shelling of civilians in Kramatorsk, attacks on civilian busses in Volnovakha, among others. The pro-Russian forces have also run secret torture prisons in the region.

Reactions
The Organization for Security and Cooperation in Europe (OSCE), which has been monitoring the conflict in Ukraine since 2014, said it had not found any evidence to support Russia's allegations.

On March 7, 2022, Ukraine filed a complaint with the International Court of Justice, stating that Russia's allegations of genocide were untrue and in no case could provide a legal basis for the invasion and that under the 1948 Convention on the Prevention and Punishment of the Crime of Genocide prosecuted for Russia's invasion of Ukraine. On March 16, 2022, the International Court of Justice ruled that Russia must "immediately cease its military operations in Ukraine", stating that "Ukraine has a reasonable right not to accept military action by the Russian Federation to prevent and punish the so-called genocide in Ukraine."

The International Association of Genocide Scholars (IAGS) issued a statement condemning Putin's "misappropriation and misuse of the term genocide," Melanie O'Brien, president of the International Association of Genocide Scholars, told Reuters. Said that "there is absolutely no evidence that a genocide is taking place in Ukraine".

German Chancellor Olaf Scholz dismissed Putin's claims as "ridiculous", saying there was no evidence of genocide in eastern Ukraine.

See also 

 Allegations of genocide of Ukrainians in the 2022 Russian invasion of Ukraine
 Russia–Ukraine relations
 Russian war crimes#Ukraine
 Russo-Ukrainian War
 Disinformation in the 2022 Russian invasion of Ukraine
 Where have you been for eight years?
 Ukraine v. Russian Federation (2022)

References

 
Fake news
Prelude to the 2022 Russian invasion of Ukraine
Disinformation operations
Incitement to genocide